Belgica was and is the name of three Belgian research vessels, with a name derived ultimately from the Latin Gallia Belgica.

See also

 The project to recreate RV Belgica (1884) at De Steenschuit's yard in Boom, Antwerp.

Ship names